Wallengren is a surname. Notable people with the surname include:

Axel Wallengren (1865–1896), Swedish author, poet, and journalist
Hans Daniel Johan Wallengren (1823–1894), Swedish clergyman and entomologist
Orma W. Wallengren, American screenwriter